The Louise Bridge crosses the Bow River in Calgary, Alberta, Canada. 

The bridge connects Downtown West End with Memorial Drive and Kensington. It is configured with reversible lanes to accommodate higher traffic into Downtown during the early morning hours, and higher outbound traffic during the afternoon commute.

History
The bridge was built in 1921 and originally it carried street car and pedestrian traffic. It was named after Louise Cushing, daughter of William Henry Cushing, Calgary mayor from 1900 to 1901.

The bridge was rehabilitated in 1995, with a design conceived by  Simpson Roberts Wappel, at a cost of $5.1 million. It carries a daily traffic of 26,000 vehicles.

Design
The bridge is a reinforced concrete structure built on five wall arched spans.

See also
List of bridges in Calgary
List of bridges in Canada

Sources 

Road bridges in Alberta
Bridges in Calgary